Carlos Alberto Bechtholdt Bazzano (born 10 July 1969 in Buenos Aires, Argentina) is an Argentine former footballer who played as a midfielder for clubs in Argentina, Chile, Ecuador and Honduras.

Personal life
He is the father of the Argentine footballer Franco Bechtholdt.

Titles
 Unión San Felipe 2000 Primera B
 Curicó Unido 2008 Primera B

External links
 
 

Living people
1969 births
Footballers from Buenos Aires
Argentine footballers
Association football midfielders
Argentine people of German descent
Argentine people of Italian descent
Club Atlético Platense footballers
Unión San Felipe footballers
Audax Italiano footballers
Coquimbo Unido footballers
Curicó Unido footballers
S.D. Quito footballers
Defensores Unidos footballers
C.D. Victoria players
Primera B de Chile players
Chilean Primera División players
Argentine expatriate footballers
Argentine expatriate sportspeople in Chile
Expatriate footballers in Chile
Argentine expatriate sportspeople in Ecuador
Expatriate footballers in Ecuador
Argentine expatriate sportspeople in Honduras
Expatriate footballers in Honduras
Liga Nacional de Fútbol Profesional de Honduras players